Paul John Maloney (born 13 January 1952) is an English former professional footballer who played as a winger in the Football League for York City, in non-League football for Frickley Athletic, and was on the books of Huddersfield Town without making a league appearance.

References

1952 births
Living people
People from Rossington
Footballers from Doncaster
English footballers
Association football midfielders
Huddersfield Town A.F.C. players
York City F.C. players
Frickley Athletic F.C. players
English Football League players